Pipiza austriaca is a species of hoverfly, from the family Syrphidae, in the order Diptera.

Description
External images
For terms see Morphology of Diptera Wing length  6–8 mm. Hind femora strongly thickened, with a large ventral ridge. Wing with darkened cloud. Thorax and abdomen pale-haired. The larva is described and figured by  Goeldlin (1974)   See references for determination.

Distribution
Palearctic Atlantic Europe. All Europe if older determinations are correct.

Biology
Habitat:Quercus woodland clearings thickets of Rubus fruticosus along hedges, field-margins with a tall herb layer Atlantic scrub (Corylus) along hedges, field-margins with tall herb vegetation.
Flowers visited include umbellifers, Euphorbia, Ranunculus. 
 Flies mid-June to end August. Pipiza larvae are predators of gall forming aphids.

References

Diptera of Europe
Pipizinae
Insects described in 1822
Taxa named by Johann Wilhelm Meigen